Osek is a town in Teplice District in the Ústí nad Labem Region of the Czech Republic. It has about 4,600 inhabitants.

Administrative parts
Villages of Dlouhá Louka and Hrad Osek are administrative parts of Osek.

Geography
A short part of the municipal territory borders with Germany. The southern part of the territory with the built-up area lies in the Most Basin, the northern part lies in the Ore Mountains. The Osecký Stream flows through the town.

Salesiova výšina is a rock city of huge quartzite blocks, pillars and fissures. It is protected as a nature monument.

History
The history of the area is closely connected with the Osek Monastery. Between 1196 and 1197, Cistercian monks arrived from Mašťov and founded the monastery. The monastery complex grew over time to become the economic and social hub of the region. In 1278, it was looted by Brandenburg troops.

The village of Osek was founded shortly before the monastery. Until the early 14th century, the inhabitants of the village made a living mainly by cattle breeding. In the 14th century, mining of silver and tin developed.

In 1421 and then again in 1429, the monastery was burned down by the Hussites and many monks were killed. The property of the monastery was gradually dismantled, and in 1580 it was abolished by Emperor Rudolf II. Osek was acquired by the Prague archbishopric and the monks were forced to leave for Zbraslav Monastery. The dissolution of the monastery was annulled in 1614 by Pope Paul V. During the Thirty Years' War, the Osek estate was confiscated by Protestants and sold to several buyers. In 1626, the monastery was returned to the Cistercians and began to regain its glory, which fully developed in the 18th century.

Demographics

Culture
Osek Festival is an annual event with fairground markets, demonstrations of traditional crafts and funfair attractions.

Sights

The main landmark is the Osek Monastery. It is an extensive complex of buildings, built from the Romanesque to the Baroque era. The main reconstruction into its current Baroque appearance took place in 1712–1718, when it was rebuilt by the architect Octavio Broggio. The interior of the monastery Church of the Assumption of the Virgin Mary was decorated by painters Václav Vavřinec Reiner and Jan Kryštof Liška.

The ruin of the medieval Rýzmburk (Riesenburg) Castle is located northwest of the town. It belonged to its founders, the noble Rýzmburk family until 1398; the ownership then shifted to the margraves of Meissen. The castle was built shortly before 1250. It was abandoned in 1538 and fell into disrepair. It was one of the strongest fortresses in Bohemia that was probably never conquered. It has two parts, the first one is the core with residential towers and a chapel, and the second one is a large complex surrounded by a wall with shooting turrets, dominated by a massive bergfried. Today it is freely accessible.

In popular culture
Parts of the film Anna Proletářka were filmed on location in Osek and Osek railway station.

Notable people
Karl Lieffen (1926–1999), German actor
Kamil Střihavka (born 1965), singer

Gallery

References

External links

Cities and towns in the Czech Republic
Populated places in Teplice District
Towns in the Ore Mountains